= Gift suite =

A gift suite or gifting suite is a location where companies give products to celebrities in exchange for the celebrity taking a photo with the product or on a red carpet while standing in front of a press wall displaying company logos.

Companies that are trying to build brand recognition or maintain a premier position in the market like to be associated with celebrities and other persons with significant social status. Fans of a celebrity are likely to look favorably on products or services associated with that person. The concept of the gifting suite dates back to the 1990s, created to service presenters and performers backstage at award shows.

Most gifting suites take place in Hollywood during award weeks. During the week before these shows, there are often up to ten gifting suites operating independently from the event itself. During other award weeks like the Golden Globes, Screen Actors Guild Awards and the VMAs there will also be gifting suites, but they are typically fewer.

Official gifting suites are contracted by award shows and Hollywood events and exist in a location on-site and backstage. They work in an official capacity with the show's production and talent. Events like the Oscars, Screen Actors Guild Awards, and Golden Globes do not currently host any official gifting suites at their events.
